Natural tantalum (73Ta) consists of two stable isotopes: 181Ta (99.988%) and  (0.012%).

There are also 35 known artificial radioisotopes, the longest-lived of which are 179Ta with a half-life of 1.82 years, 182Ta with a half-life of 114.43 days, 183Ta with a half-life of 5.1 days, and 177Ta with a half-life of 56.56 hours. All other isotopes have half-lives under a day, most under an hour. There are also numerous isomers, the most stable of which (other than 180mTa) is 178m1Ta with a half-life of 2.36 hours. All isotopes and nuclear isomers of tantalum are either radioactive or observationally stable, meaning that they are predicted to be radioactive but no actual decay has been observed.

Tantalum has been proposed as a "salting" material for nuclear weapons (cobalt is another, better-known salting material). A jacket of 181Ta, irradiated by the intense high-energy neutron flux from an exploding thermonuclear weapon, would transmute into the radioactive isotope  with a half-life of 114.43 days and produce approximately 1.12 MeV of gamma radiation, significantly increasing the radioactivity of the weapon's fallout for several months. Such a weapon is not known to have ever been built, tested, or used. While the conversion factor from absorbed dose (measured in Grays) to effective dose (measured in Sievert) for gamma rays is 1 while it is 50 for alpha radiation (i.e., a gamma dose of 1 Gray is equivalent to 1 Sievert whereas an alpha dose of 1 Gray is equivalent to 50 Sievert), gamma rays are only attenuated by shielding, not stopped. As such, alpha particles require incorporation to have an effect while gamma rays can have an effect via mere proximity. In military terms, this allows a gamma ray weapon to deny an area to either side as long as the dose is high enough, whereas radioactive contamination by alpha emitters which do not release significant amounts of gamma rays can be counteracted by ensuring the material is not incorporated.

List of isotopes 

|-
| 
| style="text-align:right" | 73
| style="text-align:right" | 82
| 154.97459(54)#
| 13(4) µs[12(+4−3) µs]
|
|
| (11/2−)
|
|
|-
| rowspan=2|
| rowspan=2 style="text-align:right" | 73
| rowspan=2 style="text-align:right" | 83
| rowspan=2|155.97230(43)#
| rowspan=2|144(24) ms
| β+ (95.8%)
| 156Hf
| rowspan=2|(2−)
| rowspan=2|
| rowspan=2|
|-
| p (4.2%)
| 155Hf
|-
| style="text-indent:1em" | 
| colspan="3" style="text-indent:2em" | 102(7) keV
| 0.36(4) s
| p
| 155Hf
| 9+
|
|
|-
| rowspan=2|
| rowspan=2 style="text-align:right" | 73
| rowspan=2 style="text-align:right" | 84
| rowspan=2|156.96819(22)
| rowspan=2|10.1(4) ms
| α (91%)
| 153Lu
| rowspan=2|1/2+
| rowspan=2|
| rowspan=2|
|-
| β+ (9%)
| 157Hf
|-
| style="text-indent:1em" | 
| colspan="3" style="text-indent:2em" | 22(5) keV
| 4.3(1) ms
|
|
| 11/2−
|
|
|-
| style="text-indent:1em" | 
| colspan="3" style="text-indent:2em" | 1593(9) keV
| 1.7(1) ms
| α
| 153Lu
| (25/2−)
|
|
|-
| rowspan=2|
| rowspan=2 style="text-align:right" | 73
| rowspan=2 style="text-align:right" | 85
| rowspan=2|157.96670(22)#
| rowspan=2|49(8) ms
| α (96%)
| 154Lu
| rowspan=2|(2−)
| rowspan=2|
| rowspan=2|
|-
| β+ (4%)
| 158Hf
|-
| rowspan=3 style="text-indent:1em" | 
| rowspan=3 colspan="3" style="text-indent:2em" | 141(9) keV
| rowspan=3|36.0(8) ms
| α (93%)
| 154Lu
| rowspan=3|(9+)
| rowspan=3|
| rowspan=3|
|-
| IT
| 158Ta
|-
| β+
| 158Hf
|-
| rowspan=2|
| rowspan=2 style="text-align:right" | 73
| rowspan=2 style="text-align:right" | 86
| rowspan=2|158.963018(22)
| rowspan=2|1.04(9) s
| β+ (66%)
| 159Hf
| rowspan=2|(1/2+)
| rowspan=2|
| rowspan=2|
|-
| α (34%)
| 155Lu
|-
| rowspan=2 style="text-indent:1em" | 
| rowspan=2 colspan="3" style="text-indent:2em" | 64(5) keV
| rowspan=2|514(9) ms
| α (56%)
| 155Lu
| rowspan=2|(11/2−)
| rowspan=2|
| rowspan=2|
|-
| β+ (44%)
| 159Hf
|-
| rowspan=2|
| rowspan=2 style="text-align:right" | 73
| rowspan=2 style="text-align:right" | 87
| rowspan=2|159.96149(10)
| rowspan=2|1.70(20) s
| α
| 156Lu
| rowspan=2|(2#)−
| rowspan=2|
| rowspan=2|
|-
| β+
| 160Hf
|-
| rowspan=2 style="text-indent:1em" | 
| rowspan=2 colspan="3" style="text-indent:2em" | 310(90)# keV
| rowspan=2|1.55(4) s
| β+ (66%)
| 160Hf
| rowspan=2|(9)+
| rowspan=2|
| rowspan=2|
|-
| α (34%)
| 156Lu
|-
| rowspan=2|
| rowspan=2 style="text-align:right" | 73
| rowspan=2 style="text-align:right" | 88
| rowspan=2|160.95842(6)#
| rowspan=2|3# s
| β+ (95%)
| 161Hf
| rowspan=2|1/2+#
| rowspan=2|
| rowspan=2|
|-
| α (5%)
| 157Lu
|-
| style="text-indent:1em" | 
| colspan="3" style="text-indent:2em" | 50(50)# keV
| 2.89(12) s
|
|
| 11/2−#
|
|
|-
| rowspan=2|
| rowspan=2 style="text-align:right" | 73
| rowspan=2 style="text-align:right" | 89
| rowspan=2|161.95729(6)
| rowspan=2|3.57(12) s
| β+ (99.92%)
| 162Hf
| rowspan=2|3+#
| rowspan=2|
| rowspan=2|
|-
| α (.073%)
| 158Lu
|-
| rowspan=2|
| rowspan=2 style="text-align:right" | 73
| rowspan=2 style="text-align:right" | 90
| rowspan=2|162.95433(4)
| rowspan=2|10.6(18) s
| β+ (99.8%)
| 163Hf
| rowspan=2|1/2+#
| rowspan=2|
| rowspan=2|
|-
| α (.2%)
| 159Lu
|-
| 
| style="text-align:right" | 73
| style="text-align:right" | 91
| 163.95353(3)
| 14.2(3) s
| β+
| 164Hf
| (3+)
|
|
|-
| 
| style="text-align:right" | 73
| style="text-align:right" | 92
| 164.950773(19)
| 31.0(15) s
| β+
| 165Hf
| 5/2−#
|
|
|-
| style="text-indent:1em" | 
| colspan="3" style="text-indent:2em" | 60(30) keV
|
|
|
| 9/2−#
|
|
|-
| 
| style="text-align:right" | 73
| style="text-align:right" | 93
| 165.95051(3)
| 34.4(5) s
| β+
| 166Hf
| (2)+
|
|
|-
| 
| style="text-align:right" | 73
| style="text-align:right" | 94
| 166.94809(3)
| 1.33(7) min
| β+
| 167Hf
| (3/2+)
|
|
|-
| 
| style="text-align:right" | 73
| style="text-align:right" | 95
| 167.94805(3)
| 2.0(1) min
| β+
| 168Hf
| (2−,3+)
|
|
|-
| 
| style="text-align:right" | 73
| style="text-align:right" | 96
| 168.94601(3)
| 4.9(4) min
| β+
| 169Hf
| (5/2+)
|
|
|-
| 
| style="text-align:right" | 73
| style="text-align:right" | 97
| 169.94618(3)
| 6.76(6) min
| β+
| 170Hf
| (3)(+#)
|
|
|-
| 
| style="text-align:right" | 73
| style="text-align:right" | 98
| 170.94448(3)
| 23.3(3) min
| β+
| 171Hf
| (5/2−)
|
|
|-
| 
| style="text-align:right" | 73
| style="text-align:right" | 99
| 171.94490(3)
| 36.8(3) min
| β+
| 172Hf
| (3+)
|
|
|-
| 
| style="text-align:right" | 73
| style="text-align:right" | 100
| 172.94375(3)
| 3.14(13) h
| β+
| 173Hf
| 5/2−
|
|
|-
| 
| style="text-align:right" | 73
| style="text-align:right" | 101
| 173.94445(3)
| 1.14(8) h
| β+
| 174Hf
| 3+
|
|
|-
| 
| style="text-align:right" | 73
| style="text-align:right" | 102
| 174.94374(3)
| 10.5(2) h
| β+
| 175Hf
| 7/2+
|
|
|-
| 
| style="text-align:right" | 73
| style="text-align:right" | 103
| 175.94486(3)
| 8.09(5) h
| β+
| 176Hf
| (1)−
|
|
|-
| style="text-indent:1em" | 
| colspan="3" style="text-indent:2em" | 103.0(10) keV
| 1.1(1) ms
| IT
| 176Ta
| (+)
|
|
|-
| style="text-indent:1em" | 
| colspan="3" style="text-indent:2em" | 1372.6(11)+X keV
| 3.8(4) µs
|
|
| (14−)
|
|
|-
| style="text-indent:1em" | 
| colspan="3" style="text-indent:2em" | 2820(50) keV
| 0.97(7) ms
|
|
| (20−)
|
|
|-
| 
| style="text-align:right" | 73
| style="text-align:right" | 104
| 176.944472(4)
| 56.56(6) h
| β+
| 177Hf
| 7/2+
|
|
|-
| style="text-indent:1em" | 
| colspan="3" style="text-indent:2em" | 73.36(15) keV
| 410(7) ns
|
|
| 9/2−
|
|
|-
| style="text-indent:1em" | 
| colspan="3" style="text-indent:2em" | 186.15(6) keV
| 3.62(10) µs
|
|
| 5/2−
|
|
|-
| style="text-indent:1em" | 
| colspan="3" style="text-indent:2em" | 1355.01(19) keV
| 5.31(25) µs
|
|
| 21/2−
|
|
|-
| style="text-indent:1em" | 
| colspan="3" style="text-indent:2em" | 4656.3(5) keV
| 133(4) µs
|
|
| 49/2−
|
|
|-
| 
| style="text-align:right" | 73
| style="text-align:right" | 105
| 177.945778(16)
| 9.31(3) min
| β+
| 178Hf
| 1+
|
|
|-
| style="text-indent:1em" | 
| colspan="3" style="text-indent:2em" | 100(50)# keV
| 2.36(8) h
| β+
| 178Hf
| (7)−
|
|
|-
| style="text-indent:1em" | 
| colspan="3" style="text-indent:2em" | 1570(50)# keV
| 59(3) ms
|
|
| (15−)
|
|
|-
| style="text-indent:1em" | 
| colspan="3" style="text-indent:2em" | 3000(50)# keV
| 290(12) ms
|
|
| (21−)
|
|
|-
| 
| style="text-align:right" | 73
| style="text-align:right" | 106
| 178.9459295(23)
| 1.82(3) y
| EC
| 179Hf
| 7/2+
|
|
|-
| style="text-indent:1em" | 
| colspan="3" style="text-indent:2em" | 30.7(1) keV
| 1.42(8) µs
|
|
| (9/2)−
|
|
|-
| style="text-indent:1em" | 
| colspan="3" style="text-indent:2em" | 520.23(18) keV
| 335(45) ns
|
|
| (1/2)+
|
|
|-
| style="text-indent:1em" | 
| colspan="3" style="text-indent:2em" | 1252.61(23) keV
| 322(16) ns
|
|
| (21/2−)
|
|
|-
| style="text-indent:1em" | 
| colspan="3" style="text-indent:2em" | 1317.3(4) keV
| 9.0(2) ms
| IT
| 179Ta
| (25/2+)
|
|
|-
| style="text-indent:1em" | 
| colspan="3" style="text-indent:2em" | 1327.9(4) keV
| 1.6(4) µs
|
|
| (23/2−)
|
|
|-
| style="text-indent:1em" | 
| colspan="3" style="text-indent:2em" | 2639.3(5) keV
| 54.1(17) ms
|
|
| (37/2+)
|
|
|-
| rowspan=2|
| rowspan=2 style="text-align:right" | 73
| rowspan=2 style="text-align:right" | 107
| rowspan=2|179.9474648(24)
| rowspan=2|8.152(6) h
| EC (86%)
| 180Hf
| rowspan=2|1+
| rowspan=2|
| rowspan=2|
|-
| β− (14%)
| 180W
|-
| style="text-indent:1em" | 
| colspan="3" style="text-indent:2em" | 77.1(8) keV
| colspan=3 align=center|Observationally stable
| 9−
| 1.2(2)×10−4
|
|-
| style="text-indent:1em" | 
| colspan="3" style="text-indent:2em" | 1452.40(18) keV
| 31.2(14) µs
|
|
| 15−
|
|
|-
| style="text-indent:1em" | 
| colspan="3" style="text-indent:2em" | 3679.0(11) keV
| 2.0(5) µs
|
|
| (22−)
|
|
|-
| style="text-indent:1em" | 
| colspan="3" style="text-indent:2em" | 4171.0+X keV
| 17(5) µs
|
|
| (23, 24, 25)
|
|
|-
| 
| style="text-align:right" | 73
| style="text-align:right" | 108
| 180.9479958(20)
| colspan=3 align=center|Observationally stable
| 7/2+
| 0.99988(2)
|
|-
| style="text-indent:1em" | 
| colspan="3" style="text-indent:2em" | 6.238(20) keV
| 6.05(12) µs
|
|
| 9/2−
|
|
|-
| style="text-indent:1em" | 
| colspan="3" style="text-indent:2em" | 615.21(3) keV
| 18(1) µs
|
|
| 1/2+
|
|
|-
| style="text-indent:1em" | 
| colspan="3" style="text-indent:2em" | 1485(3) keV
| 25(2) µs
|
|
| 21/2−
|
|
|-
| style="text-indent:1em" | 
| colspan="3" style="text-indent:2em" | 2230(3) keV
| 210(20) µs
|
|
| 29/2−
|
|
|-
| 
| style="text-align:right" | 73
| style="text-align:right" | 109
| 181.9501518(19)
| 114.43(3) d
| β−
| 182W
| 3−
|
|
|-
| style="text-indent:1em" | 
| colspan="3" style="text-indent:2em" | 16.263(3) keV
| 283(3) ms
| IT
| 182Ta
| 5+
|
|
|-
| style="text-indent:1em" | 
| colspan="3" style="text-indent:2em" | 519.572(18) keV
| 15.84(10) min
|
|
| 10−
|
|
|-
| 
| style="text-align:right" | 73
| style="text-align:right" | 110
| 182.9513726(19)
| 5.1(1) d
| β−
| 183W
| 7/2+
|
|
|-
| style="text-indent:1em" | 
| colspan="3" style="text-indent:2em" | 73.174(12) keV
| 107(11) ns
|
|
| 9/2−
|
|
|-
| 
| style="text-align:right" | 73
| style="text-align:right" | 111
| 183.954008(28)
| 8.7(1) h
| β−
| 184W
| (5−)
|
|
|-
| 
| style="text-align:right" | 73
| style="text-align:right" | 112
| 184.955559(15)
| 49.4(15) min
| β−
| 185W
| (7/2+)#
|
|
|-
| style="text-indent:1em" | 
| colspan="3" style="text-indent:2em" | 1308(29) keV
| >1 ms
|
|
| (21/2−)
|
|
|-
| 
| style="text-align:right" | 73
| style="text-align:right" | 113
| 185.95855(6)
| 10.5(3) min
| β−
| 186W
| (2−,3−)
|
|
|-
| style="text-indent:1em" | 
| colspan="3" style="text-indent:2em" |
| 1.54(5) min
|
|
|
|
|
|-
| 
| style="text-align:right" | 73
| style="text-align:right" | 114
| 186.96053(21)#
| 2# min[>300 ns]
| β−
| 187W
| 7/2+#
|
|
|-
| 
| style="text-align:right" | 73
| style="text-align:right" | 115
| 187.96370(21)#
| 20# s[>300 ns]
| β−
| 188W
|
|
|
|-
| 
| style="text-align:right" | 73
| style="text-align:right" | 116
| 188.96583(32)#
| 3# s[>300 ns]
|
|
| 7/2+#
|
|
|-
| 
| style="text-align:right" | 73
| style="text-align:right" | 117
| 189.96923(43)#
| 0.3# s
|
|
|
|
|

Tantalum-180m 
However, no radioactivity from any decay mode of this nuclear isomer has ever been observed. Only a lower limit on its half-life of over 1015 years has been set, by observation. Gamma or beta decay would require many units of angular momentum to be removed in a single step, so that the process would be very slow.

The very unusual nature of 180mTa is that the ground state of this isotope is less stable than the isomer. This phenomenon is exhibited in bismuth-210m (210mBi) and americium-242m (242mAm), among other nuclides.  has a half-life of only 8 hours.  is the only naturally occurring nuclear isomer (excluding radiogenic and cosmogenic short-living nuclides). It is also the rarest primordial nuclide in the Universe observed for any element that has any stable isotopes.  In an s-process stellar environment with a thermal energy kBT = 26 keV (i.e. a temperature of 300 million kelvin), the nuclear isomers are expected to be fully thermalized, meaning that 180Ta rapidly transitions between spin states and its overall half-life is predicted to be 11 hours.

As of October 3, 2016 the half life of 180mTa is calculated from experimental observation to be at least  (45 quadrillion) years.

References 

 Isotope masses from:

 Isotopic compositions and standard atomic masses from:

 Half-life, spin, and isomer data selected from the following sources.

 
Tantalum
Tantalum